João de Barros (born 25 May 1993) is a male São Tomé and Príncipe sprinter. He competed in the 100 metres event at the 2015 World Championships in Athletics in Beijing, China.

See also
 São Tomé and Príncipe at the 2015 World Championships in Athletics

References

External links

1993 births
Living people
São Tomé and Príncipe male sprinters
Place of birth missing (living people)
World Athletics Championships athletes for São Tomé and Príncipe